Pseudorthosia was a genus of moths of the family Noctuidae, it is now considered a subgenus of Dichagyris.

Species
 Dichagyris variabilis Grote, 1874

References
Natural History Museum Lepidoptera genus database
Pseudorthosia at funet

Noctuinae